Voivodeship road 117 (abbreviated DW 117) is a route in the Polish voivodeship roads network. The route links Obrzycko with Ostroróg.

Important settlements along the route

Obrzycko
Dobrogostowo
Pęckowo
Kluczewo
Ostroróg

Route plan

References

117